is a song by J-pop artist and Hello! Project member Miki Fujimoto, released as a single on March 12, 2002. It sold a total of 43,670 copies.

Track listing 
 
 
  (Instrumental)

External links 
 Aenai Nagai Nichiyōbi entry at Up-Front Works

Miki Fujimoto songs
2002 singles
Songs written by Tsunku
2002 songs